The 2003–04 season was the 98th season in the existence of AJ Auxerre and the club's 23rd consecutive season in the top flight of French football. In addition to the domestic league, Auxerre participated in this season's editions of the Coupe de France, Coupe de la Ligue, and UEFA Cup. The season covered the period from 1 July 2003 to 30 June 2004.

Transfers

In

Out

Competitions

Overall record

Ligue 1

League table

Results summary

Results by round

Matches

Coupe de France

Coupe de la Ligue

UEFA Cup

Statistics

Goalscorers

References

AJ Auxerre seasons
Auxerre